The 1985 1. divisjon was the 41st completed season of top division football in Norway. The season began on 27 April 1985 and ended on 13 October 1985.

22 games were played with 2 points given for wins and 1 for draws. Number eleven and twelve were relegated. The winners of the two groups of the 2. divisjon were promoted, as well as the winner of a series of play-off matches between the two second-placed teams in the two groups of the 2. divisjon and number ten in the 1. divisjon. 

Rosenborg BK won the league after defeating league leader Lillestrøm S.K. 1–0 in the 22nd and final round. The game was attended by 28,569 spectators, which is, as of 2019, still a league record attendance for a single game in the Norwegian top flight.

Teams and locations
''Note: Table lists in alphabetical order.

League table

Results

Relegation play-offs
The qualification matches were contested between Moss (10th in the 1. divisjon), Sogndal (2nd in the 2. divisjon - Group A), and Tromsø (2nd in the 2. divisjon - Group B). Tromsø won and was promoted to the 1. divisjon.

Results
Tromsø - Sogndal 1–0
Sogndal - Moss 0–2
Moss - Tromsø 0–1

Table

Season statistics

Top scorers

Attendances

References

External links
League table
Fixtures
Goalscorers

Eliteserien seasons
Norway
Norway
1